Tianhan (天漢) was a Chinese era name used by several emperors of China. It may refer to:

Tianhan (100–97 BC), era name used by Emperor Wu of Han
Tianhan (917), era name used by Wang Jian, emperor of Former Shu (called Han during that particular year)

See also
Tian Han (1898–1968), Chinese writer